Saad Assis (born 26 October 1979), is a Brazilian futsal player who plays for FC Barcelona Futsal as an Ala.

Saad Assis has been a member of the Italian national futsal team.

During the 2008 FIFA Futsal World Cup Final, Assis played in nine matches.

Honours
1 Liga Futsal (1999)
1 Coppa Italia (2006)
4 Campeonato Mineiro (1997, 1998, 1999, 2000)

References

External links
LNFS profile
UEFA profile

1979 births
Living people
Sportspeople from São Paulo
Italian men's futsal players
FC Barcelona Futsal players
Brazilian emigrants to Italy